The Monument to Majit Gafuri is a monument in Ufa.
He located at Bashkir Academic Drama Theater Mazhit Gafuri. Opened in 1978.

References

Monuments and memorials in Ufa
Statues in Russia
1978 establishments in Russia
Sculptures in the Soviet Union
Outdoor sculptures in Russia
Sculptures of men in Russia